The 2009–10 Robert Morris Colonials men's basketball team represented Robert Morris University in the 2009–2010 NCAA Division I basketball season. Robert Morris was coached by Mike Rice Jr. and played their home games at the Charles L. Sewall Center in Moon Township, PA. The Colonials are a members of the Northeast Conference. They finished the season 23–12, 15–3 in NEC play. They won the 2010 Northeast Conference men's basketball tournament to earn the conference's automatic bid to the 2010 NCAA Division I men's basketball tournament. They earned a 15 seed in the South Region and played 2 seed Villanova in the first round. The Colonials took Villanova to overtime before falling 73–70 to end their season.

Roster
Source

2009–10 schedule and results
Source
All times are Eastern

|-
!colspan=9| Exhibition

|-
!colspan=9| Regular Season

|-
!colspan=9| 2010 Northeast Conference men's basketball tournament

|-
!colspan=10| 2010 NCAA Division I men's basketball tournament

References

Robert Morris Colonials
Robert Morris
Robert Morris Colonials men's basketball seasons
Robert
Robert